Maryam Abacha (born 4 March 1949) is the widow of Sani Abacha, Nigeria's military ruler from 1993 to 1998. After the death of her husband, Maryam was caught while attempting to leave Nigeria with 38 suitcases filled with cash.

In 1999, Maryam Abacha said that her husband acted in the good will of Nigeria; an official of the Nigerian government said that Maryam Abacha said that to convince the government to grant her a reprieve, as the president, Olusegun Obasanjo, had been jailed by Sani Abacha. As of 2000 Maryam Abacha remained in Nigeria and continued to proclaim the innocence of her husband despite several human right abuses attributed to him. She resides in Kano state, Nigeria.

Maryam and Sani Abacha had three daughters and seven sons. Maryam Abacha's eldest surviving son is Mohammed Abacha.

Legacy

 Maryam Abacha founded National Hospital Abuja (originally National Hospital For Women And Children).
 African First Ladies Peace Mission.F.E.A.P, N.P.I.

Bibliography 
 Kabir, Hajara Muhammad,. Northern women development. [Nigeria]. . .

References

External links

 "Obasanjo visit sparks Kano riot." BBC.
 
 Why I fought Abubakar Audu– Ex-Kogi commissioner, Hajiya 

Living people
1949 births
First Ladies of Nigeria
People from Kaduna State
Maryam
20th-century Nigerian women